Endotricha olivacealis is a moth of the  family Pyralidae. It is found in Russia, China, Korea, Japan, Taiwan, India, Malaysia and western Java.

The wingspan is 24–26 mm. The ground colour of the forewings is yellow brown, with bushy violet scales in the basal and external area. The ground colour of the hindwings is pink violet and the costal area is brownish yellow.

References

Moths described in 1864
Endotrichini
Moths of Japan